Judge Berger may refer to:

Irene Berger (born 1954), judge of the United States District Court for the Southern District of West Virginia
Wendy Berger (born 1968), judge of the United States District Court for the Middle District of Florida

See also
Thomas R. Berger (1933–2021), justice of the Supreme Court of British Columbia
Warren E. Burger (1907–1995), chief justice of the United States